Let the Dancers Inherit the Party is a studio album by Sea Power. It was released on 31 March 2017, licensed from the band's own Golden Chariot label to Caroline International.

Recording for the album primarily took place in Brighton at Brighton Electric Recording Studios, with additional recording and mixing at Voltaire Road Studios in Clapham. Early work on the album, including recording and song-writing, was done in diverse locations including Lympne Castle and on Skye.

At the end of 2016, the band ran a crowd-funding campaign to enable them to release the album. Fans paid in advance for a 4-CD box set containing the album along with bonus discs of demos, alternative versions and instrumentals. This box set, in a limited edition of 1000, was distributed at the same time as the regular album.

In early 2017 the songs "Bad Bohemian" and "Keep on Trying (Sechs Freunde)" were released as digital singles, with videos, to promote the album ahead of its release date. "Electrical Kittens" was also made available for streaming shortly before the album's release.

Two vinyl versions of the album were released. The regular one-disc version has slight modifications to the track-listing to balance the timings, while the deluxe two-disc version has an extended version of "Saint Jerome", length 5:35.

Track listing

CD

CD box set bonus discs

Note
"Matches" was the placeholder title of Saint Jerome when it appeared on the setlist during the band's 2016 tour dates. This may or may not be a retitling of the extended version of the song that appears on the deluxe vinyl with an identical running time.

Note

Regular vinyl

Deluxe vinyl

Charts

References

2017 albums
British Sea Power albums